Fort Similkameen is the site of a former Hudson's Bay Company fort located in the Similkameen region of British Columbia.  The fort was also called Fort Keremeos  situated near the Similkameen River close to the City of Keremeos.

References

Hudson's Bay Company forts
Ghost towns in British Columbia